Children of the Ghetto is a 1915 William Fox film with Broadway star Wilton Lackaye. Israel Zangwill wrote the story.

 Frank Powell directed. Advertisements for the film are extant.

The film was based on Zangwill's The Children of the Ghetto: A Study of a Peculiar People by Israel (London, 1892) and his play Children of the Ghetto (New York, October 16, 1899).

See also
The Girls of the Ghetto

References

Films directed by Frank Powell
1915 drama films
Silent American drama films
American silent films
1915 films
1910s American films